The 1970–71 Algerian Cup is the 9th edition of the Algerian Cup. CR Belcourt are the defending champions, having beaten USM Alger 4–1 in the previous season's final.

Round of 64

Round of 32

Round of 16

Quarter-finals

Semi-finals

Final

Match

References

Algerian Cup
Algerian Cup
Algerian Cup